An information professional or information specialist is someone who collects, records, organises, stores, preserves, retrieves, and disseminates printed or digital information. The service delivered to the client is known as an information service.  

The versatile term "information professional" is  used to describe similar and sometimes overlapping professions, such as librarians, archivists, information managers, information systems specialists , information scientists, records managers, and information consultants, but terminology differs among sources and organisations. Information professionals work in a variety of private, public, and academic institutions, or independently.

Skills 
Since the term information professional is broad, the skills required for this profession are also varied. A Gartner report in 2011 pointed out that "Professional roles focused on information management will be different to that of established IT roles. An 'information professional' will not be one type of role or skill set, but will in fact have a number of specializations". Thus, an information professional can possess a variety of different skills, depending on the sector in which the person is employed.

Some essential cross-sector skills are:
 IT skills, such as word-processing and spreadsheets, digitisation skills, and conducting Internet searches, together with skills loan systems, databases, content management systems, and specially designed programmes and packages.
 Customer service. An information professional should have the ability to address the information needs of customers.
 Language proficiency. This is essential in order to manage the information at hand and deal with customer needs.
 Soft skills. These include skills such as negotiating, conflict resolution, and time management.
 Management training. An information professional should be familiar with notions such as strategic planning and project management.

Moreover, an information professional should be skilled in planning and using relevant systems, in capturing and securing information, and in accessing it to deliver service whenever the information is required.

Associations 
Most countries have a professional association who oversee the professional and academic standards of librarians and other information professionals.  There are also international associations related to LIS (library and information science), the most prominent of which is the International Federation of Library Associations and Institutions (IFLA). In many countries, LIS courses are accredited by the relevant professional association, as the American Library Association (ALA) in the USA, the Chartered Institute of Library and Information Professionals (CILIP) in the UK, and the Australian Library and Information Association (ALIA) in Australia.

Qualifications 

Educational institutions around the world offer academic degrees, or degrees on related subjects such as Archival Studies, Information Systems, Information Management, and Records Management. Some of the institutions offering information science education refer to themselves as an iSchool, such as the CiSAP (Consortium of iSchools Asia Pacific, founded 2006) in Asia and the iSchool Caucus in the USA. There are also online e-learning resources, some of which offer certification for information professionals.

Africa 
Information development in Africa started later than in other continents, mainly due to a lack of internet access, expertise and resources to manage digital infrastructure, and "opportunities for capacity development and knowledge-sharing".

Nowadays, academic degrees in information studies are available at many universities of African countries, such as the University of Pretoria (South Africa), University of Nairobi (Kenya), Makerere University (Uganda), University of Botswana (Botswana), and University of Nigeria (Nigeria).

Asia 
LIS-related studies are available in more than 30 Asian countries. Some examples listed by iSchools Inc. are the University of Hong Kong, University of Tsukuba, Japan, Yonsei University, South Korea, National Taiwan University and Wuhan University, China.

Australasia 
The Australian Library and Information Association (ALIA)  lists six schools offering undergraduate and postgraduate accredited university courses for "Librarian and Information Specialists" on their website.

In New Zealand, the Open Polytechnic of New Zealand and the Victoria University of Wellington offer undergraduate and postgraduate degree courses for information professionals.

Europe 
The majority of European countries have universities, colleges, or schools which offer bachelor's degrees in LIS studies. Over 40 universities offer master's degrees in LIS-related fields, and many institutions, such as the Swedish School of Library and Information Science at the University of Borås (Sweden), the University of Barcelona (Spain), Loughborough University (UK), and Aberystwyth University (Wales, UK) also offer PhD degrees.

North America 
Information studies and degrees are available at numerous academic institutions throughout the US and Canada. US professional associations, together with their European counterparts, have undertaken many educational initiatives and pioneered many advances in the field of Information studies, such as increased interdisciplinarity and more effective delivery of distance learning.
The Association for Intelligent Information Management, based in Silver Spring, MD, offers a qualification called Certified Information Professional (CIP), earned upon passing an examination, with certification remaining valid for three years.

South America 
There are many schools and colleges in Latin American countries which offer courses in Library Science, Archival Studies, and Information Studies, however these subjects are taught completely separately.

See also 

 Archival science
 Association of UK Media Librarians
 Education for librarianship
 Information retrieval
 Information school
 Information scientist
 International Society for Knowledge Organization (ISKO)
 Library and information science
 List of library associations
 UKSG

References

Further reading

External links
 World List of schools and departments of information science, information management and related disciplines

Education and training occupations
Library occupations
Information science
Professionals